André Claro Amaral Ventura (born 15 January 1983) is a right-wing Portuguese politician and former sports pundit and Professor. He briefly worked as a senior civil servant at the Portuguese tax office. He founded the Chega party in April 2019, and was elected to the Assembly of the Republic for the Lisbon District that October. He also ran for President in 2021, having come third in the election, with 11.9% of the vote.

Education and youth 
Ventura is the son of the owner of a small local bicycle shop, and an office worker. He is a native of Algueirão, Sintra, a suburban locality in the Lisbon metropolitan area. Unlike his peers, he was not raised in a religion because his parents wanted him to choose his own. At 14, he became an enthusiastic Catholic, was baptised, and made his first communion and confirmation. He wanted to be a priest and attended the Penafirme Seminary, the minor seminary of the Patriarchate of Lisbon, but he did not continue his ecclesiastical formation because he fell in love. He graduated in law from the Law Faculty of NOVA University Lisbon, with a grade of 19 out of 20, an extraordinary achievement in the Portuguese higher education grading scheme.

In 2013, he finished his PhD thesis in public law from the Faculty of Law, University College Cork, Ireland, funded by a prestigious scholarship from the Portuguese national science foundation, the Foundation for Science and Technology, in which he criticised "criminal populism" and "stigmatisation of minorities", and revealing concern about the "expansion of police powers". In a 2019 interview to Diário de Notícias addressing the apparent contradictions between the issues raised in his PhD thesis and his later political views, Ventura said he has "always made a distinction between science and opinion" and called his thesis "scientific analysis, not ideological postulate".

He published two novels, Montenegro in 2008, and A Última Madrugada do Islão ("The Last Dawn of Islam") in 2009, both with significant elements of female submission and homoeroticism. Notably, in Montenegro, the word "intifada" is used four times: three times as a metaphor for strength and courage, and once when describing the act of sexual penetration. The publication of A Última Madrugada do Islão, a novel about the death of Yasser Arafat, was suspended by the publishers, Chiado Editora, for its "incendiary potential", for its gratuitous references to Muhammad and the leaders of the Palestine Liberation Organization.

Career 
He taught at the Autonomous University of Lisbon, from 2013 to 2019, and at NOVA, from 2016 to 2018. He was a consultant at Caiado Guerreiro a law firm, from 2018 to 2019. He also had a column in the newspaper Correio da Manhã, the most widely read daily newspaper in the country and was a sports commentator on the TV channel CMTV, from the Cofina company, from 2014 to 2020. He is also a jurist-consultant of the Tax Authority (AT) where he was employed from 2011 to 2014. He is on leave from AT without pay since 2014.

In an interview in July 2017, in response to Ventura's statements about Roma people, José Pinto Coelho (leader of the far-right National Renovator Party) wrote "unfortunately, it seems, some of 'my people' are still in the parties of the system". In another, Ventura said that he "vehemently repudiates the support of the far-right". In the course of the same campaign, Ventura made several controversial statements about the gypsy community in the municipality of Loures, having become the target of a criminal complaint presented by the opposing candidate from Bloco de Esquerda, headed by Fabian Figueiredo. He is accused by Pinto Coelho of stealing the speech from the PNR party. In October 2017, Ventura stated that he was ready to dispute the leadership of the PSD, in case nobody else advanced against Rui Rio.

On 9 April 2019, he founded the political party Chega, and three days later he joined the Basta! coalition for the 2019 European Parliamentary Elections. Failing to elect any MEP, the coalition was dissolved on 30 July 2019. He ran in the 2019 Portuguese legislative elections as the main candidate of Chega's electoral list for the Lisbon constituency; he was the party's first and single member to be elected to Parliament. He claims to have positions that are "economically liberal, culturally nationalist and conservative in matters of customs".

Member of the Assembly of the Republic 
André Ventura was elected a member of the Assembly of the Republic for the Lisbon constituency in the 2019 Portuguese legislative election. He claims to be "the voice of common people" and an "anti-system politician". In September 2020, he presented a proposal to decrease the number of deputies from 230 to 100, which was ruled unconstitutional by the Committee on Constitutional Affairs, Rights, Freedoms and Guarantees. In November, he renounces these proposals to accompany the PSD. In January 2020, he proposed a 5 to 7.5% decrease in Members' salaries.

He provoked an outcry in Parliament in January 2020 by proposing that Joacine Katar Moreira, an Assembly member born in Guinea Bissau who said that museum items from Portugal's former colonies be returned, be similarly "returned to her country of origin". At the 2020 convention of the Chega party, he passed a motion at the party's 2020 convention calling for the removal of ovaries from women who have abortions. Facing protests, he then called for the motion to be dropped.

Ventura was present at a Zero Movement protest in front of the Assembly. The Zero Movement is an unofficial police union that has been accused of political links to Ventura's party. The only politician to speak, he did so allegedly without an invitation from union leaders. He received a shower of applause.

In November 2020, he was fined more than €400 for discrimination against gypsy communities. In December of the same year, he was ordered to pay €3,370 for ethnic discrimination in the form of harassment. Ventura, later in a press conference at the Assembly of the Republic, stated that he would not pay the fine: "to limit the freedom of expression of a citizen, a deputy of the nation and a political leader".

Ventura criticised the Minister of Justice, Francisca Van Dunem, for the release of prisoners to ease COVID-19 transmissions, saying that the measure was an "infamy".

Ventura criticised the state of emergency decree of 17 December 2020, saying: "This is not really a state of emergency. It is a state of chaos over a state of chaos, which is destroying the lives of the Portuguese people without planning, that the only thing they have to give to the country is a Director of Health who says to have breakfast at Christmas and [this] will solve your problems."On 22 December 2020, Ventura requested the temporary suspension of his term in the Assembly to run in the 2021 Portuguese presidential election but this suspension was prevented by the Parliament on 29 December. On 31 December, after the decision of the majority of the parliamentary groups not to authorise the suspension of mandate, Ventura advanced with a subpoena against the Assembly of the Republic and Ferro Rodrigues, the Speaker, in the Supreme Administrative Court.

2021 presidential campaign 
On 8 February 2020, in Portalegre, Ventura announced his candidacy for the office of President of the Republic in the 2021 election.

Ventura invited actress Maria Vieira to be his campaign director (mandatária) for the Portuguese communities abroad and chose Patrícia Sousa Uva (ex-member of Chega) to be the national director. Subsequently, with the resignation of the latter, Ventura invited Rui Paulo Sousa, 7th member of the national board, to become the national campaign director.

On 18 December 2020, Ventura handed 10,250 signatures of proponents to the Constitutional Court, as legally required to formalise his candidacy for Belém Palace. On 30 December, his candidacy was formally accepted by the Constitutional Court.

At the beginning of the electoral campaign, the president of the French National Rally party, Marine Le Pen, confirmed that she would go to Lisbon to support Ventura's presidential candidacy.

In a televised debate against incumbent Marcelo Rebelo de Sousa, Ventura showed a photograph of the president in the Bairro da Jamaica, a poor and largely black neighborhood in Amora, District of Setúbal, where there had been tensions with the police. He accused the president of not being truly right-wing, and called the black residents in the photograph "bandits". In September 2021, a Portuguese court convicted Ventura for social segregation in the aftermath of these events related to Bairro da Jamaica.

Ventura came third with 11.9% of the vote, behind Marcelo Rebelo de Sousa (60.7%) and Socialist Ana Gomes (12.9%).

Political views
Ventura has expressed controversial views in the past, whilst the majority of international media refer to his ideology as far-right. About António de Oliveira Salazar, Portuguese dictator during the Estado Novo regime, André Ventura said: "The Republic led by Dr. António de Oliveira Salazar, for most of the time, also didn't solve [the country's problems] and set us back a long way in various aspects. It didn't allow us to have the development that we could have had, especially in the post-World War II framework. Portugal could have developed extraordinarily well and we fell behind, just like the Spanish".

Ventura's comments on Romani people are often described as racist and xenophobic. On being compared negatively to Donald Trump and Jair Bolsonaro, Ventura responded "I am very accustomed to that and it doesn't worry me. These are the ideas that I believe in. In addition to life imprisonment and chemical castration, I also want a reduction in Islamic migration, especially from countries known for terrorism".

Ventura supports legal equality for gay people, but he believes that same-sex couples should be in civil partnerships and not marriages. He is personally opposed to abortion, but does not want the procedure to be criminalised. He supports the legalisation and regularisation of prostitution as a way to protect and integrate sex workers, and believes that legalisation of recreational drugs increases drug traffic. He is personally opposed to bullfighting, but opposes its sudden abolition due to the economic role it plays in some towns.

In May 2020, during the COVID-19 pandemic in Portugal, Ventura proposed a specific containment plan for the Roma community. He was lambasted for this proposal by professional footballer Ricardo Quaresma, of Romani descent. In June 2020, Ventura organised a counter-protest the day after anti-racist concentrations were announced in honour of actor Bruno Candé, victim of a premeditated homicide. This counter-protest was made under the motto "Portugal is not racist", denying the allegation of racism in Portugal and condemning the "politically correct" associations and affirming that the counter-protest "is a manifestation of everything but white supremacy".

He has spoken in admiration of Mariano Rajoy, conservative former prime minister of Spain. Ventura signed the Madrid Charter, a document drafted by the Spanish party Vox that describes far left-wing groups as enemies of Ibero-America involved in a "criminal project" that are "under the umbrella of the Cuban regime". On 24th February 2022 Twitter permanently suspended Ventura's account for violating the rules of the social network regarding the “conduct of propagating hate”.

Books 
 Introdução à Fiscalidade, e-book, Lisboa (2017)
 Justiça, Corrupção e Jornalismo (co-authored with Miguel Fernandes), Vida Económica (2015) 
 A Nova Justiça Internacional, Chiado Editora, Lisboa (2015) 
 A Nova Administração Pública (inclui a nova Lei Geral do Trabalho em Funções Públicas anotada), Quid Juris, Lisboa (2014) 
 A Reforma do IRC (com António Carlos dos Santos), Vida Económica, Lisboa (2014) 
 Lições de Direito Fiscal, Chiado Editora, Lisboa (2014) 
 Lições de Direito Penal, Volume I, UAL / Instituto de Direito Publico / Chiado Editora (2013), Montenegro, com 2.ª ed. revista, pela Chiado Editora, Lisboa (2008) 
 A Última Madrugada do Islão, Chiado Editora, Lisboa (2009)

References

External links 

 André Ventura's Curriculum Vitae
 Meet André Ventura – President of Chega

|-

 

Portuguese politicians
Portuguese civil servants
People from Sintra
1983 births
Living people
Members of the Assembly of the Republic (Portugal)
NOVA University Lisbon alumni
Antiziganism in Portugal
Anti-Islam sentiment in Portugal
Alumni of University College Cork
Academic staff of NOVA University Lisbon
Candidates for President of Portugal
Signers of the Madrid Charter
Chega politicians